Velutarina is a genus of fungi in the family Helotiaceae.

References 

Helotiaceae
Taxa named by Richard P. Korf